Intini Uyu Pata or Inti Uyu (Aymara inti sun, uyu pen (enclosure), yard, cemetery) is an archaeological site in Peru. The site was declared a National Cultural Heritage (Patrimonio Cultural) of Peru by the National Institute of Culture.

See also 
 Tupu Inka

References 

Archaeological sites in Peru
Archaeological sites in Puno Region